Ger O'Neill (born 13 October 1962) is an Irish retired hurler who played as a corner-forward for the Tipperary senior team.

O'Neill joined the team during the 1982 championship and was a regular member of the team until his retirement almost a decade later. During that time he won one All-Ireland winners' medal as a non-playing substitute.

At club level O'Neill is a one-time county club championship winners' medalist with Cappawhite.

References

1962 births
Living people
Cappawhite hurlers
Tipperary inter-county hurlers